Mats are used for safety in gymnastics, and in training new skills. They are usually a piece of foam (covered in leather) ranging from 1.5-28 inches thick, covered in a vinyl or plastic lining. The foam ranges in density from relatively firm to very soft.

Landing mats are usually blue, but can also be almost any other color. Mats come in a range of sizes, from very small mats used on the beam, to very large mats, used in the foam pits.

Typically, in both competition and practice, the use of mats is mandatory. On every event except floor exercise, pommel horse and vault, gymnasts may use an additional landing mat, without deduction, which may be adjusted for distance.

Types

Beam pads 

These are thin mats that fasten around the balance beam. They are used only in training to give gymnasts training high-level skills additional protection and a wider landing space while working on the apparatus. Makeshift beam pads can also be constructed from soft mats placed over the beam surface, if necessary.

Blocks 
Blocks are firm, trapezoid or rectangular shaped mats. They can be attached to other blocks via velcro and straps. Blocks are routinely used as step-stools for gymnasts working on the bars or beam and as practice vaulting surfaces.

Crash mats 
Typically, these mats are extremely thick and soft, and are used when an athlete is learning a new, high-impact skill.

Folding panel mats 

These mats are thin, firm mats about twelve feet in length. They usually have alternating color panels and can be folded, stacked and attached to other mats via velcro strips at the ends. Normally used for practicing tumbling moves, these mats may be stacked to provide a protective surface for gymnasts working on the low balance beam, or provide a means for a gymnast to reach the bars or rings. They have a history of usage in gymnastics, martial arts and physical education classes. Schools generally purchase new folding mats once every 7 years. These mats are perfect for providing a level of protection for the body from high impact collisions with hard solid surfaces such as hardwood or concrete flooring. There are two main categories of foam used in these types of mats, cross-linked polyethylene foam and polyurethane foam.

Foam core

Polyethylene foam 
Cross-linked polyethylene foam is a very solid and sturdy foam, when being used in a folding panel gym mat—it is generally accepted to be at a standard of 1 3/8" thickness. Mats with this type of foam would be considered for professional use in sporting events.

Polyurethane foam 
The foam is firm, but not as firm as the cross-linked polyethylene foam used in 1 3/8" thick models. Because of the lack of firmness mats made with this type of foam generally use specifically 2" thick 100 ILD open cell 4.5 lb. density polyurethane foam. Generally accepted uses of mats with this kind of foam are practice venues, home use, and youth amateur sports events.

Vinyls 
Each mat although maybe of different foam generally have similar vinyl enclosures. 14 to 18 ounce polyester laminated vinyl is generally used in all folding mat applications. The vinyl covers should be fire-retardant (class - A), puncture and mildew resistant and have antibacterial properties to help maintain good hygiene. Velcro on each end of the mat allows a near seamless connection to additional mats for tumbling runs or expansive areas.

Sizes 
Ranging from 4 feet x 8 feet to 6 feet x 12 feet, sizes usually only matter when limited by space or personal preference. In most cases – like in gymnastics – multiple mats are purchased to be strung together via Velcro to create the ultimate sure-footed tumbling experience. Generally mats used for gymnasiums and gymnastics mats come in 2-foot-wide panels and is why many in the industry call them folding panel mats or folding mats. The 2-foot-wide panels allow for ease in both set up and clean up when using the mats to becoming the perfect compact size for storage.

Incline mats 

Incline mats, also known as wedge mats, cheese mats or simply "the cheese", are firm mats shaped like right triangles. They are mainly used to teach and train beginning and intermediate gymnastics skills such as rolls, walkovers and handsprings.

Springboard mats 
These firm mats are used on vault. They are U-shaped and surround the springboard on three sides. In the event that the gymnast's foot misses the springboard during his or her vault attempt, he or she can push off the mat for momentum and, hopefully, avoid a serious injury. Under the current Code of Points, performing a Yurchenko-style vault without the safety mat results in an automatic score of zero.

Landing mats 
These mats are thin and soft, and are usually white or red in color to distinguish them from the other mats and floor exercise area. They are used on the floor exercise to lessen the "sting," or impact, of tumbling run landings and for dismounts on the beam or floor. Sting mats are routinely used in training, but are only rarely used or permitted in competition.

References

Gymnastics apparatus
Floors